Box Tunnel passes through Box Hill on the Great Western Main Line (GWML) between Bath and Chippenham. The  tunnel was the world's longest railway tunnel when it was completed in 1841.

Built between December 1838 and June 1841 for the Great Western Railway (GWR) under the direction of Isambard Kingdom Brunel, the straight tunnel descends on a 1 in 100 gradient from its eastern end. At the time the tunnel's construction was considered dangerous due to its length and the composition of the underlying strata. The west portal is Grade II* listed and the east portal is Grade II listed.

Ammunition was stored near the tunnel during World War II, reusing mine workings. During the 2010s, the tunnel was modified and the track lowered to prepare it for electrification.

History

Background
During the 1830s, Isambard Kingdom Brunel developed a plan for a railway running east–west between London and Bristol. The Great Western Main Line, would maintain either level ground or gentle gradients of no greater than 1 in 1000 along most of its route. Between Swindon and Bath, at the highest point of the line a tunnel was proposed through Box Hill, outside Corsham.

The tunnel would have a steep gradient of 1 in 100. At the time, the use of such a gradient inside the tunnel allegedly provoked criticism by some of Brunel's contemporaries. Box Tunnel would be the longest railway tunnel at almost  in length.

Geology
While  a tunnel had been included in the 1835 Great Western Railway Act, contemporary engineers considered the construction of Box Tunnel to be an impossibility at worst and a dangerous undertaking at best. The challenge posed was not only its length but the difficult underlying strata it would have to pass through. The rocks through which it passes comprise Great Oolite overlying fuller's earth, and Inferior Oolite and Bridport Sand beneath, a combination with which tunnellers were familiar.

The Great Oolite limestone, known as Bath Stone, is easily worked and had been used for construction since Roman times. In the 17th and 18th centuries it was extracted by the room and pillar method and used for many buildings in Bath, Somerset.
To assess the geology more accurately, between 1836 and 1837, Brunel sank eight shafts at intervals along the tunnel's projected alignment.

Construction
The GWR selected George Burge of Herne Bay as the major contractor, being responsible for undertaking 75 per cent of overall tunnel length, working from the western end. Burge appointed Samuel Yockney as his engineer and manager. Locally based Lewis and Brewer were responsible for the remainder, starting from the eastern side. One of Brunel's personal assistants, William Glennie, was in overall charge until completion.

During December 1838,  construction commenced. The shafts were the safety exits from the tunnel.

Candles provided the only lighting in the workings and were consumed at a rate of one tonne per week, which was equalled by the weekly consumption of explosives. Due to the considerable time required for men to enter and exit the workings, blasting  took place while they were in the tunnel. This practice and water ingress exceeding the calculated volumes, has been attributed as causing most of the deaths that occurred. About 100 navvies were killed during the tunnel's construction. Additional pumping and drainage were required during and after its construction. Large amounts of water entering the tunnel in the winter months impeded progress.

Once the eastern section had been blasted out, it was cut to form a gothic arch and left unlined. The western section was excavated using picks and shovels and the walls were lined with brick. Over 30 million bricks were used which were manufactured in nearby Chippenham and transported in horse-drawn carts. Horses were used to remove much of the spoil.

The restrictions imposed by the site contributed to a delay in the tunnel's completion. By August 1839, only 40 per cent of the works had been finished. The Box Tunnel was the last section of the GWML to be finished, although not for lack of effort on the part of Brunel.

Brunel was so delighted that he reportedly removed a ring from his finger and gave it to the works foreman.

Opening
On 30 June 1841, the tunnel was opened to traffic with little in the way of ceremony.  A special train departed London Paddington and traversed the whole of the GWR to complete the first rail journey to Temple Meads Station in Bristol in about four hours.

After the opening, for several months, work continued to finish the tunnel's western portal near Box, Wiltshire which Brunel had designed in a grand classical style - grander than the eastern portal as it is in full view of the London to Bath road. The height of the opening is far in excess of what was required (and indeed reduces once inside), but it gives the feel of a generous celebratory monument to a new form of travel. That height has been further accentuated with the 2015 lowering of the trackbed for electric catenary to be installed. The eastern portal at Corsham has a more modest brick face, with rusticated stone dressings.

Commentators and critics voiced concerns and disapproval about the unlined section of the tunnel; they believed that it lacked solidity and was a danger to traffic. The GWR responded to these complaints by building a brick arch underneath part of the unlined section close to the entrance which was prone to frost damage. Some areas of the tunnel remain unlined.

Brunel's birthday

GWR franchise rebutted the theory that the rising sun passed through the tunnel on Isambard Brunel's 9 April birthday, finding in 2017 that the sunrise did not shine fully through the tunnel. Librarian C.P. Atkins calculated in 1985 that full illumination through Box Tunnel would occur on 7 April in non-Leap years and on 6 April in Leap years. The Society of Genealogists in 2016 suggested the sun shone through the tunnel on 6 April, the birthday of Brunel's sister, Emma Joan Brunel, three years out of four during the 1830s .

Defence use

Starting in 1844, the hill surrounding the tunnel was subject to extensive quarrying to extract Bath stone for buildings. In the run-up towards the Second World War, the need to provide secure storage for munitions at distributed locations across the UK was recognised. During the 1930s, a proposal to create three Central Ammunition Depots (CADs) was submitted: one in the north (Longtown, Cumbria); one in the Midlands (Nesscliffe, Shropshire); and one in the South of England at Tunnel quarry, Monkton Farleigh and Eastlays Ridge.

During the 1930s, Tunnel Quarry was renovated by the Royal Engineers as one of the three major stockpiles. The logistics operation was designed to cope with a maximum of  tons of ammunition per day.

A Royal Air Force station, RAF Box, was established and used an area of the tunnels. In response to the Bristol Blitz, during 1940, Alfred McAlpine developed a fallback aircraft engine factory for use by the Bristol Aeroplane Company (BAC), although it never went into production. BAC used the facility to accommodate the company's experimental department, which was developing an engine to power bombers and the Bristol Beaufighter.

The CAD was closed at the end of the war but was maintained in operational condition until the 1950s. The sidings were cleared, and saw no further use until the mid-1980s when a museum was opened on the site for a short period. During the post-war years, portions of the ammunition depot were redeveloped for other facilities, including the Central Government War Headquarters, RAF No.1 Signal Unit, Controller Defence Communication Network and the Corsham Computer Centre. As of the present day, the only element of the complex that remains is the former computer centre and the visible north end of the tunnel has been sealed by concrete and rubble. The former CAD has been reused as a secure commercial document storage facility.

Electrification
During the 2010s, overhead electrification infrastructure was installed so that electric locomotives could be used on the GWML. Box Tunnel was  modified for the catenary and associated infrastructure.

Geographical location

 East portal: 
 Ventilation shaft: 
 Ventilation shaft: 
 Centre of tunnel: 
 Ventilation shaft: 
 Ventilation shaft: 
 West portal:

See also

 List of tunnels in the United Kingdom
Stapleford Miniature Railway 1/5 railway featuring stone replica of Box tunnel

References

Citations

Bibliography

External links

 
 Network Rail Virtual Archive: Box Tunnel, engineering drawings of tunnel
 Subterranea Britannica entry on the Corsham bunkers
 Brunel portal
 Tunnel does align, but 3 days before Brunel's birthday; however the sky is not visible through it, detailed analysis of the alignment
 Wiltshire's Secret Underground City: Burlington Articles, interactive map and video tour from BBC Wiltshire
 The light at the end of the tunnel. How Brunel designed his memorial into the Box Tunnel, which is aligned with the sun on his birthday, the 9th of April.

Box, Wiltshire
Railway tunnels in England
Rail transport in Wiltshire
Tunnels in Wiltshire
Great Western Main Line
Great Western Railway
Works of Isambard Kingdom Brunel
Tunnels completed in 1841